Parides hahneli, the Hahnel's Amazonian swallowtail, is a species of butterfly in the family Papilionidae. It is endemic to Brazil in the states of Rondônia, Mato Grosso, Amazonas and Pará, where it was placed on the list of endangered species in 2008.

The butterfly was named to honour its collector Paul Hahnel. "Collecting in the neighbourhood of the Amazon, from Para to the foot of the Andes, seems to be more difficult nowadays than formerly. It is true the steamboat takes the collector from place to place, but in the neighbourhood of the larger settlements there is no longer much for him to seek, and living has become extraordinarily expensive. And it is difficult to find a place near the forest fit to live in and secure against flagrant robbery, and the collector is very dependent upon chance in this respect."

Description
It has tails. The forewing has three yellow-grey bands or patches; hindwing with area of the same colour, occupying the greater part of the wing. A technical description is provided by Rothschild, W. and Jordan, K. (1906)

Taxonomy

Parides hahneli is a member of the chabrias species group

The members are
Parides chabrias 
Parides coelus 
Parides hahneli 
Parides mithras 
Parides pizarro 
Parides quadratus

Status
Parides hahneli is rare.

References
Gary Larson, 1993 Farside 18

Sources

Fauna of Brazil
Parides
Endemic fauna of Brazil
Papilionidae of South America
Taxonomy articles created by Polbot
Butterflies described in 1882